Józef Wysocki (1809, Tulchyn – 1873, Paris) was a Polish general, soldier in the November Uprising of 1830, the Hungarian Revolution of 1848 and the January Uprising of 1863.

1809 births
1873 deaths
People from Tulchyn
People from Bratslavsky Uyezd
November Uprising participants
Generals of the January Uprising
Activists of the Great Emigration
Members of Polish government (January Uprising)
Burials at Père Lachaise Cemetery
People from the Russian Empire of Polish descent